The 1988 Pittsburgh Pirates season was the 107th season of the Pittsburgh Pirates franchise; the 102nd in the National League. This was their 19th season at Three Rivers Stadium. The Pirates finished second in the National League East with a record of 85–75.

Offseason
 January 20, 1988: Dave Hostetler was signed as a free agent by the Pirates.
 March 26, 1988: Mackey Sasser and Tim Drummond were traded by the Pirates to the New York Mets for Randy Milligan and Scott Henion (minors).
 March 30, 1988: Hipólito Peña was traded by the Pirates to the New York Yankees for Orestes Destrade.
 March 31, 1988: Mike Bielecki was traded by the Pirates to the Chicago Cubs for Mike Curtis (minors).

Regular season

Season standings

Game log

|- style="background:#cfc;"
| 1 || April 5 || @ Phillies || 5–3 || Dunne || Rawley || Robinson || 46,394 || 1–0
|- style="background:#fbb;"
| 2 || April 6 || @ Phillies || 5–6 (14) || Maddux || Kipper || — || 15,532 || 1–1
|- style="background:#cfc;"
| 3 || April 8 || @ Cardinals || 4–3 || Fisher || Cox || Robinson || 51,647 || 2–1
|- style="background:#fbb;"
| 4 || April 9 || @ Cardinals || 0–3 || Mathews || Walk || Worrell || 36,542 || 2–2
|- style="background:#cfc;"
| 5 || April 10 || @ Cardinals || 5–3 (11) || Kipper || Worrell || Gott || 31,968 || 3–2
|- style="background:#cfc;"
| 6 || April 11 || Phillies || 5–1 || Drabek || Gross || — || 54,089 || 4–2
|- style="background:#cfc;"
| 7 || April 13 || Phillies || 7–0 || Fisher || Ruffin || — || 9,825 || 5–2
|- style="background:#cfc;"
| 8 || April 14 || Phillies || 4–2 || Walk || Carman || Robinson || 6,222 || 6–2
|- style="background:#fbb;"
| 9 || April 15 || @ Cubs || 0–6 || Sutcliffe || Smiley || — || 35,084 || 6–3
|- style="background:#cfc;"
| 10 || April 16 || @ Cubs || 4–0 || Drabek || Maddux || — || 30,564 || 7–3
|- style="background:#cfc;"
| 11 || April 17 || @ Cubs || 12–7 || Robinson || Schiraldi || — || 29,562 || 8–3
|- style="background:#cfc;"
| 12 || April 19 || Cardinals || 3–0 || Fisher || Cox || — || 5,048 || 9–3
|- style="background:#cfc;"
| 13 || April 20 || Cardinals || 8–1 || Walk || Mathews || — || 15,522 || 10–3
|- style="background:#fbb;"
| 14 || April 21 || Cardinals || 3–9 || O'Neal || Smiley || — || 6,833 || 10–4
|- style="background:#cfc;"
| 15 || April 22 || Cubs || 8–4 || Drabek || Lancaster || — || 16,250 || 11–4
|- style="background:#cfc;"
| 16 || April 23 || Cubs || 5–4 || Gott || Gossage || — || 20,214 || 12–4
|- style="background:#cfc;"
| 17 || April 24 || Cubs || 4–2 || Walk || Sutcliffe || Robinson || 19,934 || 13–4
|- style="background:#cfc;"
| 18 || April 26 || @ Giants || 2–0 || Smiley || Reuschel || Gott || 11,738 || 14–4
|- style="background:#fbb;"
| 19 || April 27 || @ Giants || 4–6 || Dravecky || Drabek || Price || 10,137 || 14–5
|- style="background:#cfc;"
| 20 || April 28 || @ Giants || 2–1 (10) || Robinson || Lefferts || Gott || 10,520 || 15–5
|- style="background:#fbb;"
| 21 || April 29 || @ Padres || 3–6 || Hawkins || Palacios || Davis || 16,185 || 15–6
|- style="background:#cfc;"
| 22 || April 30 || @ Padres || 5–1 || Walk || Grant || — || 24,357 || 16–6
|-

|- style="background:#cfc;"
| 23 || May 1 || @ Padres || 4–2 || Smiley || Show || Gott || 21,694 || 17–6
|- style="background:#fbb;"
| 24 || May 2 || @ Dodgers || 3–6 || Orosco || Drabek || — || 26,821 || 17–7
|- style="background:#fbb;"
| 25 || May 3 || @ Dodgers || 6–14 || Belcher || Dunne || — || 26,943 || 17–8
|- style="background:#fbb;"
| 26 || May 4 || @ Dodgers || 5–8 || Hershiser || Palacios || — || 30,423 || 17–9
|- style="background:#cfc;"
| 27 || May 6 || Padres || 4–1 (12) || Jones || Davis || — || 25,045 || 18–9
|- style="background:#fbb;"
| 28 || May 7 || Padres || 2–3 || Show || Gott || — || 24,555 || 18–10
|- style="background:#cfc;"
| 29 || May 8 || Padres || 6–2 || Drabek || Jones || — || 20,756 || 19–10
|- style="background:#fbb;"
| 30 || May 9 || Giants || 6–8 || Robinson || Robinson || Lefferts || 6,388 || 19–11
|- style="background:#cfc;"
| 31 || May 10 || Giants || 6–2 || Palacios || Downs || Gott || 9,275 || 20–11
|- style="background:#cfc;"
| 32 || May 11 || Dodgers || 2–1 (11) || Medvin || Pena || — || 26,367 || 21–11
|- style="background:#cfc;"
| 33 || May 12 || Dodgers || 7–4 || Smiley || Hershiser || — || 11,072 || 22–11
|- style="background:#cfc;"
| 34 || May 13 || Reds || 6–5 || Robinson || Murphy || — || 31,705 || 23–11
|- style="background:#fbb;"
| 35 || May 14 || Reds || 3–5 || Soto || Dunne || Franco || 28,059 || 23–12
|- style="background:#fbb;"
| 36 || May 15 || Reds || 6–7 (12) || Franco || Jones || — || 33,789 || 23–13
|- style="background:#fbb;"
| 37 || May 16 || @ Astros || 2–9 || Deshaies || Walk || — || 13,570 || 23–14
|- style="background:#fbb;"
| 38 || May 17 || @ Astros || 2–3 || Scott || Smiley || Smith || 15,000 || 23–15
|- style="background:#fbb;"
| 39 || May 18 || @ Astros || 2–4 || Ryan || Drabek || Smith || 19,259 || 23–16
|- style="background:#cfc;"
| 40 || May 20 || Braves || 10–3 || Dunne || Glavine || — || 18,880 || 24–16
|- style="background:#cfc;"
| 41 || May 21 || Braves || 7–3 || Fisher || Coffman || — || 21,211 || 25–16
|- style="background:#fbb;"
| 42 || May 22 || Braves || 4–6 || Mahler || Walk || Sutter || 32,683 || 25–17
|- style="background:#fbb;"
| 43 || May 23 || Astros || 0–3 || Scott || Smiley || — || 7,480 || 25–18
|- style="background:#cfc;"
| 44 || May 24 || Astros || 5–4 || Gott || Andersen || — || 8,200 || 26–18
|- style="background:#cfc;"
| 45 || May 25 || Astros || 4–3 || Dunne || Andujar || Robinson || 8,108 || 27–18
|- style="background:#fbb;"
| 46 || May 27 || @ Reds || 3–5 || Pacillo || Fisher || Franco || 29,445 || 27–19
|- style="background:#cfc;"
| 47 || May 28 || @ Reds || 5–2 || Walk || Browning || Robinson || 42,232 || 28–19
|- style="background:#cfc;"
| 48 || May 29 || @ Reds || 4–2 || Smiley || Rasmussen || Gott || 30,660 || 29–19
|- style="background:#cfc;"
| 49 || May 30 || @ Braves || 14–2 || Drabek || Smith || — || 6,893 || 30–19
|- style="background:#fbb;"
| 50 || May 31 || @ Braves || 1–11 || Glavine || Dunne || — || 4,483 || 30–20
|-

|- style="background:#fbb;"
| 51 || June 1 || @ Braves || 2–14 || Mahler || Fisher || — || 6,059 || 30–21
|- style="background:#fbb;"
| 52 || June 2 || Expos || 3–7 || Heaton || Walk || Hesketh || 11,070 || 30–22
|- style="background:#cfc;"
| 53 || June 3 || Expos || 2–1 || Smiley || Dopson || — || 19,162 || 31–22
|- style="background:#fbb;"
| 54 || June 4 || Expos || 3–7 || Martinez || Drabek || McClure || 30,669 || 31–23
|- style="background:#fbb;"
| 55 || June 5 || Expos || 2–3 || Smith || Dunne || Parrett || 36,305 || 31–24
|- style="background:#fbb;"
| 56 || June 7 || Cubs || 5–8 || Maddux || Fisher || Gossage || 9,287 || 31–25
|- style="background:#cfc;"
| 57 || June 8 || Cubs || 5–1 || Walk || Schiraldi || — || 22,220 || 32–25
|- style="background:#cfc;"
| 58 || June 9 || Cubs || 4–3 || Gott || DiPino || — || 8,200 || 33–25
|- style="background:#fbb;"
| 59 || June 10 || Phillies || 10–12 || Harris || Robinson || Bedrosian || 20,001 || 33–26
|- style="background:#cfc;"
| 60 || June 11 || Phillies || 8–2 || Dunne || Palmer || — || 19,926 || 34–26
|- style="background:#fbb;"
| 61 || June 12 || Phillies || 4–5 || Gross || Fisher || Bedrosian || 36,134 || 34–27
|- style="background:#cfc;"
| 62 || June 13 || @ Cubs || 8–0 || Walk || Schiraldi || — || 27,142 || 35–27
|- style="background:#cfc;"
| 63 || June 14 || @ Cubs || 6–3 || Smiley || Moyer || Robinson || 28,077 || 36–27
|- style="background:#fbb;"
| 64 || June 15 || @ Cubs || 4–7 || Perry || Gott || Gossage || 26,126 || 36–28
|- style="background:#fbb;"
| 65 || June 17 || Cardinals || 3–7 || Magrane || Dunne || — || 30,267 || 36–29
|- style="background:#fbb;"
| 66 || June 18 || Cardinals || 3–6 || Tudor || Fisher || Terry || 36,682 || 36–30
|- style="background:#cfc;"
| 67 || June 19 || Cardinals || 3–2 || Walk || McWilliams || Gott || 27,656 || 37–30
|- style="background:#cfc;"
| 68 || June 20 || @ Mets || 8–5 || Smiley || Ojeda || Robinson || 42,413 || 38–30
|- style="background:#fbb;"
| 69 || June 21 || @ Mets || 0–9 || Darling || Drabek || — || 45,225 || 38–31
|- style="background:#fbb;"
| 70 || June 22 || @ Mets || 0–3 || Gooden || Dunne || Myers || 41,816 || 38–32
|- style="background:#cfc;"
| 71 || June 23 || @ Expos || 6–4 || Robinson || Parrett || Gott || 14,839 || 39–32
|- style="background:#cfc;"
| 72 || June 24 || @ Expos || 5–3 (10) || Gott || McClure || Jones || 15,781 || 40–32
|- style="background:#cfc;"
| 73 || June 25 || @ Expos || 5–1 || Smiley || Holman || — || 17,777 || 41–32
|- style="background:#cfc;"
| 74 || June 26 || @ Expos || 3–0 (10) || Robinson || Burke || — || 26,593 || 42–32
|- style="background:#cfc;"
| 75 || June 27 || Mets || 2–1 || Dunne || Gooden || Gott || 41,489 || 43–32
|- style="background:#fbb;"
| 76 || June 28 || Mets || 2–5 || Fernandez || Fisher || McDowell || 45,011 || 43–33
|- style="background:#fbb;"
| 77 || June 29 || Mets || 7–8 (11) || McDowell || Kipper || — || 41,217 || 43–34
|-

|- style="background:#cfc;"
| 78 || July 1 || @ Giants || 5–2 (10) || Robinson || Hammaker || — || 39,484 || 44–34
|- style="background:#fbb;"
| 79 || July 2 || @ Giants || 1–2 || LaCoss || Rucker || Garrelts || 22,355 || 44–35
|- style="background:#fbb;"
| 80 || July 3 || @ Giants || 0–4 || Downs || Dunne || — || 25,463 || 44–36
|- style="background:#fbb;"
| 81 || July 4 || @ Padres || 3–4 (10) || Davis || Gott || — || 35,406 || 44–37
|- style="background:#cfc;"
| 82 || July 5 || @ Padres || 3–2 || Walk || Jones || Jones || 10,415 || 45–37
|- style="background:#cfc;"
| 83 || July 7 || @ Padres || 2–0 || Smiley || Hawkins || Gott || 16,076 || 46–37
|- style="background:#cfc;"
| 84 || July 8 || @ Dodgers || 4–3 || Drabek || Leary || Gott || 40,690 || 47–37
|- style="background:#cfc;"
| 85 || July 9 || @ Dodgers || 8–2 || Dunne || Hillegas || — || 46,662 || 48–37
|- style="background:#cfc;"
| 86 || July 10 || @ Dodgers || 7–2 || Walk || Hershiser || — || 43,014 || 49–37
|- style="background:#cfc;"
| 87 || July 14 || Giants || 9–2 || Fisher || Reuschel || — || 28,325 || 50–37
|- style="background:#cfc;"
| 88 || July 15 || Giants || 8–5 || Kipper || Downs || Gott || 28,315 || 51–37
|- style="background:#cfc;"
| 89 || July 16 || Giants || 10–1 || Drabek || LaCoss || — || 28,997 || 52–37
|- style="background:#cfc;"
| 90 || July 17 || Giants || 5–4 || Robinson || Price || Gott || 25,512 || 53–37
|- style="background:#fbb;"
| 91 || July 19 || Padres || 2–6 || Jones || Smiley || — ||  || 53–38
|- style="background:#cfc;"
| 92 || July 19 || Padres || 9–5 || Fisher || Hawkins || — || 15,847 || 54–38
|- style="background:#cfc;"
| 93 || July 20 || Padres || 3–2 || Walk || Rasmussen || Gott || 24,575 || 55–38
|- style="background:#cfc;"
| 94 || July 21 || Dodgers || 3–2 || Drabek || Hershiser || Gott || 27,510 || 56–38
|- style="background:#fbb;"
| 95 || July 22 || Dodgers || 2–4 || Belcher || Dunne || Howell || 44,888 || 56–39
|- style="background:#fbb;"
| 96 || July 23 || Dodgers || 2–6 || Leary || Smiley || — || 35,817 || 56–40
|- style="background:#fbb;"
| 97 || July 24 || Dodgers || 1–2 || Hillegas || Fisher || Howell || 35,677 || 56–41
|- style="background:#fbb;"
| 98 || July 25 || @ Cardinals || 1–5 || Tudor || Walk || — || 30,763 || 56–42
|- style="background:#cfc;"
| 99 || July 26 || @ Cardinals || 2–1 || Drabek || Cox || Gott || 32,735 || 57–42
|- style="background:#cfc;"
| 100 || July 27 || @ Cardinals || 3–2 (10) || Robinson || Dayley || Gott || 31,618 || 58–42
|- style="background:#fbb;"
| 101 || July 29 || @ Mets || 0–1 || Ojeda || Smiley || — || 49,584 || 58–43
|- style="background:#fbb;"
| 102 || July 30 || @ Mets || 0–3 || Fernandez || Fisher || Myers || 50,815 || 58–44
|- style="background:#fbb;"
| 103 || July 31 || @ Mets || 1–2 || Darling || Walk || — || 46,917 || 58–45
|-

|- style="background:#cfc;"
| 104 || August 1 || @ Mets || 7–2 || Drabek || Gooden || — || 52,231 || 59–45
|- style="background:#cfc;"
| 105 || August 2 || Expos || 3–2 (10) || Gott || Heaton || — || 12,296 || 60–45
|- style="background:#fbb;"
| 106 || August 3 || Expos || 4–6 || Perez || Smiley || Burke || 16,099 || 60–46
|- style="background:#fbb;"
| 107 || August 4 || Expos || 2–3 || Dopson || Fisher || Burke || 17,726 || 60–47
|- style="background:#fbb;"
| 108 || August 5 || Mets || 2–3 || Darling || Walk || Myers || 39,925 || 60–48
|- style="background:#fbb;"
| 109 || August 6 || Mets || 3–5 || McClure || Gott || McDowell || 48,272 || 60–49
|- style="background:#fbb;"
| 110 || August 7 || Mets || 2–6 || Cone || Kipper || — || 44,931 || 60–50
|- style="background:#cfc;"
| 111 || August 8 || Mets || 1–0 || Reed || Ojeda || Gott || 38,307 || 61–50
|- style="background:#cfc;"
| 112 || August 9 || @ Expos || 10–8 || Fisher || Dopson || Gott || 37,681 || 62–50
|- style="background:#fbb;"
| 113 || August 10 || @ Expos || 4–5 || Martinez || Walk || Burke || 29,196 || 62–51
|- style="background:#cfc;"
| 114 || August 11 || @ Expos || 6–1 || Drabek || Holman || Gott || 33,599 || 63–51
|- style="background:#fbb;"
| 115 || August 12 || @ Phillies || 1–9 || Gross || Dunne || — ||  || 63–52
|- style="background:#fbb;"
| 116 || August 12 || @ Phillies || 4–6 || Bedrosian || Kipper || — || 37,673 || 63–53
|- style="background:#cfc;"
| 117 || August 13 || @ Phillies || 10–4 || Robinson || Harris || — || 35,432 || 64–53
|- style="background:#cfc;"
| 118 || August 14 || @ Phillies || 9–8 || Gott || Bedrosian || — || 36,468 || 65–53
|- style="background:#fbb;"
| 119 || August 15 || Braves || 3–4 || Puleo || Walk || Olwine || 12,112 || 65–54
|- style="background:#cfc;"
| 120 || August 16 || Braves || 4–2 || Drabek || Smith || Gott || 13,994 || 66–54
|- style="background:#cfc;"
| 121 || August 17 || Braves || 2–1 || LaPoint || Glavine || Gott || 33,164 || 67–54
|- style="background:#fbb;"
| 122 || August 19 || Astros || 1–5 || Darwin || Dunne || — || 26,352 || 67–55
|- style="background:#cfc;"
| 123 || August 20 || Astros || 2–1 || Smiley || Ryan || Gott || 23,183 || 68–55
|- style="background:#fbb;"
| 124 || August 21 || Astros || 1–2 (14) || Agosto || Kipper || — || 38,290 || 68–56
|- style="background:#fbb;"
| 125 || August 22 || Reds || 0–2 || Jackson || Drabek || — || 17,540 || 68–57
|- style="background:#cfc;"
| 126 || August 23 || Reds || 2–0 || LaPoint || Charlton || Gott || 13,406 || 69–57
|- style="background:#fbb;"
| 127 || August 24 || Reds || 2–6 || Browning || Dunne || — || 24,660 || 69–58
|- style="background:#fbb;"
| 128 || August 26 || @ Astros || 0–2 || Deshaies || Smiley || — || 27,650 || 69–59
|- style="background:#fbb;"
| 129 || August 27 || @ Astros || 1–3 || Meads || Walk || Agosto || 25,993 || 69–60
|- style="background:#cfc;"
| 130 || August 28 || @ Astros || 4–3 || Drabek || Darwin || Gott || 20,368 || 70–60
|- style="background:#cfc;"
| 131 || August 29 || @ Reds || 8–1 || LaPoint || Brown || — || 19,519 || 71–60
|- style="background:#fbb;"
| 132 || August 30 || @ Reds || 4–6 || Jackson || Fisher || Franco || 17,429 || 71–61
|- style="background:#fbb;"
| 133 || August 31 || @ Reds || 1–4 || Charlton || Gott || Franco || 18,586 || 71–62
|-

|- style="background:#fbb;"
| 134 || September 2 || @ Braves || 1–2 || Assenmacher || Gott || — || 7,938 || 71–63
|- style="background:#fbb;"
| 135 || September 5 || Mets || 5–7 || Cone || Robinson || Myers || 38,876 || 71–64
|- style="background:#cfc;"
| 136 || September 6 || Mets || 3–2 || Smiley || Ojeda || Gott || 21,296 || 72–64
|- style="background:#cfc;"
| 137 || September 7 || Expos || 5–4 || Drabek || Smith || Gott || 16,494 || 73–64
|- style="background:#fbb;"
| 138 || September 8 || Expos || 4–5 || Perez || Robinson || Hesketh || 11,289 || 73–65
|- style="background:#cfc;"
| 139 || September 9 || Phillies || 5–2 || Dunne || Sebra || Gott || 15,446 || 74–65
|- style="background:#cfc;"
| 140 || September 10 || Phillies || 5–1 || LaPoint || Rawley || — || 27,804 || 75–65
|- style="background:#fbb;"
| 141 || September 11 || Phillies || 4–7 || Freeman || Smiley || — || 18,132 || 75–66
|- style="background:#fbb;"
| 142 || September 12 || @ Mets || 2–3 || Myers || Robinson || — || 39,576 || 75–67
|- style="background:#cfc;"
| 143 || September 13 || @ Mets || 1–0 || Walk || Gooden || Gott || 36,633 || 76–67
|- style="background:#cfc;"
| 144 || September 14 || @ Expos || 4–1 (12) || Fisher || Burke || — || 10,886 || 77–67
|- style="background:#fbb;"
| 145 || September 15 || @ Expos || 4–9 || Johnson || LaPoint || McGaffigan || 9,494 || 77–68
|- style="background:#cfc;"
| 146 || September 16 || @ Phillies || 7–5 || Robinson || Harris || Gott || 17,446 || 78–68
|- style="background:#cfc;"
| 147 || September 17 || @ Phillies || 7–2 || Drabek || Carman || Robinson || 14,528 || 79–68
|- style="background:#fbb;"
| 148 || September 18 || @ Phillies || 5–6 (10) || Bedrosian || Kramer || — || 21,282 || 79–69
|- style="background:#cfc;"
| 149 || September 19 || @ Cardinals || 5–4 || Robinson || Dayley || Gott || 19,683 || 80–69
|- style="background:#cfc;"
| 150 || September 20 || @ Cardinals || 5–1 || Medvin || Terry || Gott || 27,441 || 81–69
|- style="background:#cfc;"
| 151 || September 21 || @ Cardinals || 5–0 || Smiley || DeLeon || — || 28,350 || 82–69
|- style="background:#fbb;"
| 152 || September 23 || Cubs || 3–5 (10) || Moyer || Kipper || — || 19,552 || 82–70
|- style="background:#fbb;"
| 153 || September 24 || Cubs || 1–2 || Gossage || Rucker || DiPino || 16,161 || 82–71
|- style="background:#cfc;"
| 154 || September 25 || Cubs || 7–4 || Kramer || Sutcliffe || Gott || 23,095 || 83–71
|- style="background:#fbb;"
| 155 || September 26 || Cardinals || 1–7 || DeLeon || LaPoint || — || 9,044 || 83–72
|- style="background:#cfc;"
| 156 || September 27 || Cardinals || 3–2 || Smiley || Hill || Gott || 8,994 || 84–72
|- style="background:#fbb;"
| 157 || September 28 || Cardinals || 1–2 || Magrane || Drabek || — || 21,004 || 84–73
|- style="background:#cfc;"
| 158 || September 30 || @ Cubs || 10–9 (10) || Medvin || Gossage || Fisher || 9,805 || 85–73
|-

|- style="background:#fbb;"
| 159 || October 1 || @ Cubs || 7–9 || Blankenship || Kramer || Schiraldi || 21,433 || 85–74
|- style="background:#fbb;"
| 160 || October 2 || @ Cubs || 4–8 || Moyer || Smiley || — || 22,909 || 85–75
|-

|-
| Legend:       = Win       = LossBold = Pirates team member

Record vs. opponents

Detailed records

Roster

Opening Day lineup

Player stats
Batting
Note: G = Games played; AB = At bats; H = Hits; Avg. = Batting average; HR = Home runs; RBI = Runs batted in

Pitching
Note: G = Games pitched; IP = Innings pitched; W = Wins; L = Losses; ERA = Earned run average; SO = Strikeouts

Awards and honors

1988 Major League Baseball All-Star Game
Bobby Bonilla, 3B, starter
Andy Van Slyke, OF, reserve
Bob Walk, P, reserve

Farm system

References

 1988 Pittsburgh Pirates at Baseball Reference
 1988 Pittsburgh Pirates at Baseball Almanac

Pittsburgh Pirates seasons
Pittsburgh Pirates season
Pitts